Sant Amand or Puig de Sant Amand is a mountain of Catalonia, Spain. It has an elevation of 1,851 metres above sea level.

See also
Sub-Pyrenees
Mountains of Catalonia

References

Mountains of Catalonia
One-thousanders of Spain